China Southern Airlines's frequent-flyer program is called Sky Pearl Club (simplified Chinese: 明珠俱乐部; traditional Chinese: 明珠俱樂部; pinyin: Míngzhū Jùlèbù). The Sky Pearl Club allows its members earn FFP mileage not only flying China Southern domestic segments but also on flights of other SkyTeam member airlines within the SkyTeam global network. Additionally, Sky Pearl Club members can earn and use mileage on partnered Sichuan Airlines, China Eastern Airlines, and China Airlines flights. Membership of Sky Pearl Club is divided into three tiers: Sky Pearl Gold Card (SkyTeam Elite Plus), Sky Pearl Silver Card (SkyTeam Elite) and Sky Pearl Member Card.

Accepted airlines' segments 
SkyPearl Club members can earn mileages either by flying China Southern’s segments or segments of Partner airlines within global network.

List of airlines that have accepted segment to earn mileage 

 American Airlines
 Aerolíneas Argentinas
 Air Europa
 Air France
 Alitalia
 China Airlines
 Czech Airlines
 Delta Air Lines
 KLM
 Korean Air
 MEA
 Vietnam Airlines
 Xiamen Airlines
 Sichuan Airlines

References

Frequent flyer programs